The Uninvited Guest (German: Der ungebetene Gast) is a 1925 Austrian silent film directed by Max Mack.

Cast
In alphabetical order
 Eugen Jensen 
 Dora Kaiser 
 Paul Kronegg 
 Rudi Merstallinger 
 Oskar Sachs 
 Julius Strobl 
 Hermann Thimig 
 Hugo Werner-Kahle

References

Bibliography
 Bock, Hans-Michael & Bergfelder, Tim. The Concise CineGraph. Encyclopedia of German Cinema. Berghahn Books, 2009.

External links

1925 films
Austrian silent feature films
Films directed by Max Mack
Austrian black-and-white films